Apotreubia is a genus of liverworts in the family Treubiaceae.  There are four species, including: Apotreubia nana, which is found in subalpine New Guinea, and Apotreubia pusilla, which has a disjunct distribution between eastern Asia (Himalayas to Japan) and British Columbia.

The genus name of Apotreubia is in honour of Melchior Treub (1851–1910), who was a Dutch botanist. He worked at the Bogor Botanical Gardens in Buitenzorg on the island of Java, south of Batavia, Dutch East Indies, gaining renown for his work on tropical flora.

References 

Treubiales
Liverwort genera